Anna Ingrid Caroline Schlyter, (born 9October 1961) is a Swedish artist focusing on sculpture and installations. She is best known for her furniture sculptures that have been exhibited in numerous countries.

Early years and education 

Caroline Schlyter was educated at Konstfack, Department of Fine Art and at Royal Institute of Art in Stockholm. In 1988, at the beginning of her studies, Schlyter created a rolled steel prototype of a chair that she named Lilla h (known as Little h). It was first exhibited at The House of Culture, Stockholm in 1989. That same year, Schlyter entered the international art/design scene when participating in an international furniture design competition in Asahikawa, Japan, where she received an Award Winning Entry for her chair Little h, now executed in wood, moulded from one single piece of birch plywood. "My aim was to create a clean, unbroken line and avoid joints and connecting details...", she said about her work.

Schlyter's design caught the eye of magazine editors and Little h was featured on the cover of several international magazines. Three years later, in 1992, Schlyter was awarded the Utmärkt Svensk Form ("Excellent Swedish Design") award for Little h. The jury's motivation: "Nearest a sitsculpture, which independently and skillfully plays on the modern, nordic bent-wood art. The sovereign curvature gives the impression of stretching the wood's possibilities to the utmost."

Career and exhibitions 

The chair Little h was soon after accompanied by other furniture pieces, designed in 1990, with similar one-piece moulded plywood constructions; The Lover – an armchair, The Aunt – a dressing table, Tripp, Trapp and Trull – tables, Fido – a tea-trolley, Little m – a child's chair, which all became The h-family. Leo Gullbring wrote, "Caroline Schlyter's distinctly personal and original designs challenge Swedish furniture traditions."  A major exhibition of her work entitled Familjen h-son, produced by the Swedish Exhibition Agency was first held at the Lönnströms Konstmuseum, Finland, and later travelled around Swedish museums. An accompanying booklet, was published in conjunction with the exhibition.

Caroline Schlyter's h-family has been exhibited at galleries and museums from Europe to Japan to the United States, including:
Escales autour du monde, Le Carrousel du Louvre, Paris, France (1993)
Svensk form på Svenskt Tenn hösten 1995, Svenskt Tenn, Stockholm, Sweden (1995)
D'una sola peca, Aspectos, Barcelona, Spain (1997)
Concrete Art and Contemporary Design, Verner Amell Gallery, London, U.K. (2000)
Annual Group Event, Gallery of Functional Art, Los Angeles (2002)
Nordic Cool: Hot Women Designers, National Museum of Women in the Arts, Washington, D.C. (2004)
The International Art+Design Fair 1900–2007, The Park Avenue Armory, New York (2007)
Design Miami/Basel, Basel, Switzerland (2011).

Her work is featured in several significant collections including the Nationalmuseum, Stockholm, Sweden; Vitra Design Museum, Weil am Rhein, Germany; Design Museum, London, U.K.; and V&A Museum of Childhood Victoria and Albert Museum, London, U.K.

Works 

In addition to the h-family, Schlyter has in her artistic production worked with many different materials, investigating void in the architectural space. Examples of her installations and exhibitions include:
Integrated Spatium (Little h in steel, velvet) Kulturhuset/The House of Culture, Stockholm, (1989)
Sculpture 1992 (glass, plaster, wood, gouache ) Konstfack/University College of Arts, Crafts and Design, Stockholm (1992)
The Ballerina (bronze), Commissioned by Stockholm University (1993)
Knock on Wood (relief in sheet aluminium), Råbäck Railway Station, Skaraborg (1994)
Pockory (charcoal on paper enclosed in plastic), Stockholm Smart Show, Stockholm, (1996)
A paraphrase (mixed media – photograph on canvas, charcoal, graphite ), Stockholm -European Capital of Culture'98, Stockholm (1998)
Prolog (ink on paper), The Life Gallery, Stockholm (1999)
Barhäng (ink, paper, wood ), PA & Co, Stockholm (2006)
Paradiso Inferno Purgatorio (photography/c-prints), Konstnärshuset, Stockholm (2009)
I miss U (silk-screen), Konstnärshuset, Stockholm (2011)
50-50-50 (mixed-media), Konstnärshuset, Stockholm (2012)

In 2015, Schlyter continues to work on a project consisting of sculpture in an architectural video installation, which she first showed at the Royal Institute of Art in Stockholm 2013, in a piece called Intermolecular Forces.

References 

Bryant, Kathy, "When Creators Convene, It's All Eyes Toward the Future", Los Angeles Times (U.S.A.) March 21, 2002 p. 2
Fleury, Marie-Claude, "Chère Caroline", Beaux Arts (France) No 120, 1994 p. 28
Gordan, Dan, (2014) Svenska stolar och deras formgivare 1899–2013, Stockholm: Norstedts, p. 299.  
Birks, Kimberlie, (2018) Design for Children, London: Phaidon Press Limited, p. 264,

External links 

Robinson, Mark (2013). OEN Blog 26 December 2013

Swedish women sculptors
1961 births
Living people
21st-century Swedish inventors
Swedish industrial designers
Mixed-media artists
20th-century Swedish women artists
21st-century Swedish women artists
Women inventors